The 2017 FIVB Volleyball Women's U23 World Championship was the third and final edition of the international volleyball tournament and the world championship for women's national teams under the age of 23, organized by the sport's world governing body, FIVB. The tournament was hosted by Slovenia in the city of Ljubljana from 10 September to 17 September 2017. 12 teams from the 5 confederations competed in the tournament.

Turkey defeated the home team in straight sets in the final to claim their first title in the competition. Bulgaria won the bronze medal outclassing Dominican Republic 4–2. Hande Baladın from Turkey was elected the MVP.

After this tournament, FIVB declared that "As per decision of May 2019 FIVB Board of Administration, the U23 WCH has been abolished."

Qualification 
The FIVB Sports Events Council revealed a proposal to streamline the number of teams participating in the Age Group World Championships.

Pools composition
Teams were seeded following the Serpentine system according to their FIVB World Rankings as of January 2017. FIVB reserved the right to seed the hosts as head of pool A regardless of the U23 World Ranking. Rankings are shown in brackets except the hosts who ranked 10th.

Squads

Venues

Testing of new rules
The 2017 FIVB Women's U23 World Championship will be a testing ground for a new scoring scheme currently under review by the FIVB, which, if successful, could mark a historical turning point for volleyball – much as the introduction of the Rally Scoring System did in the late 1990s.

Matches in Ljubljana will be played to best-of-seven sets with each set to 15 points (with at least a two-point difference needed). Three ranking points will be awarded to teams winning 4–0, 4–1 or 4–2. Two points go the winner of a 4–3 match with one point for the loser. It is hoped that the new scoring system will reduce overall duration of matches, while making each set more attractive and exciting – much as tie-breaks are under the current regulations. The interval between sets is reduced to two minutes (from three). Teams will switch ends after the second set - and also, if needed, after sets 4, 5 and 6. In addition, there will be no technical timeouts – just two regular thirty-second timeouts per team per set.

The basic principles for the new scheme were tested for the first time in the Dutch League in the 2016–17 season. Further testing of the scheme were conducted at the Women's U23 World Championship in Cairo. During and after the competition, players, coaches, referees and officials will be evaluating the new system through a questionnaire, while duration and scoring statistics will be gathered and analysed.

This is the second time that a U23 World Championship serves as a testbed for new regulations. Matches of the inaugural Men's U23 World Championship in 2013 in Uberlândia were played to 21-point sets. In addition to the scoring system, a new serving regulation will be tried out in Cairo, with the server not allowed to land inside the court after a jump service.

The testing of the new rules has been received with criticism from the volleyball community.

Pool standing procedure
 Number of matches won
 Match points
 Sets ratio
 Points ratio
 Result of the last match between the tied teams

Match won 4–0 , 4–1 or 4–2: 3 match points for the winner, 0 match points for the loser
Match won 4–3: 2 match points for the winner, 1 match point for the loser

Preliminary round
All times are Central European Summer Time (UTC+02:00).

Pool A

Pool B

Final round
All times are Central European Summer Time (UTC+02:00).

5th–8th places

5th–8th semifinals

7th place match

5th place match

Final four

Semifinals

3rd place match

Final

Final standing

Awards

Most Valuable Player
 Hande Baladın
Best Setter
 Eva Mori
Best Outside Spikers
 Hande Baladın
 Madeline Guillén

Best Middle Blockers
 Beyza Arici
 Saša Planinšec
Best Opposite Spiker
 Iza Mlakar
Best Libero
 Zhana Todorova

See also 
 2017 FIVB Volleyball Men's U23 World Championship

References

External links 
 Official website

FIVB Volleyball Women's U23 World Championship
FIVB Volleyball Women's U23 World Championship
International volleyball competitions hosted by Slovenia
2017 in Slovenian women's sport
September 2017 sports events in Europe
Sport in Ljubljana